The 1992 Miami Dolphins season was the franchise's 27th season in the National Football League. The season began with the team attempting to improve on their 8–8 record in 1991.

The season was a success as the Dolphins finished the season 11–5, won the AFC East and returned to the playoffs after a one-year absence. Keith Jackson, who signed a four-year, $6 million contract, made his Miami Dolphins debut in a 37-10 win versus the eventual AFC champion Buffalo Bills. Jackson recorded four receptions and 64 receiving yards, including a 24-yard touchdown score.
After shutting out the San Diego Chargers 31–0 in the Divisional Playoffs, they played host to their AFC East rivals, the Buffalo Bills, in the AFC Championship Game. However, 5 turnovers and a huge disparity in the running game meant they lost the game 29–10.

As of 2022, this is the last time the Dolphins reached the AFC Championship Game.

Offseason

NFL Draft

Personnel

Staff

Roster

Regular season

Schedule

Standings

Playoffs

AFC Divisional Playoff    Jan 10th 1993 

The Dolphins defense shut out the Chargers, holding San Diego quarterback Stan Humphries to just 18 completions on 44 pass attempts for 140 yards and intercepting four passes. Dolphins quarterback Dan Marino threw 3 touchdown passes in the second quarter - all of Marino's touchdowns were set up by interceptions.

AFC Championship Game   Jan 17th 1993 

The Bills intercepted Dolphins quarterback Dan Marino twice, recovered 3 fumbles, forced 4 sacks, and held Miami to just 33 rushing yards.

Awards and honors
 Dan Marino, AFC Pro Bowl Selection
 Dan Marino, All-Pro Selection

References

Miami Dolphins on Pro Football Reference

Miami
AFC East championship seasons
Miami Dolphins seasons
Miami Dolphins